The 2010–11 Ottawa Senators season was the team's 19th season of operation in the National Hockey League (NHL). The Senators posted a regular season record of 32 wins, 40 losses and 10 overtime/shootout losses for 74 points, failing to qualify for the Stanley Cup playoffs for the second time in three seasons. After falling to last place in the Eastern Conference by the end of January, the Senators started a rebuild, trading away several veterans for draft choices. Head coach Cory Clouston was fired at the end of the season.

Off-season
Early in the off-season, the Senators signed several players including summer development camp attendee Colin Greening on April 28 and Binghamton Senators forward Ryan Keller on May 19, as well as goaltender Mike Brodeur on May 26. After some media speculation, the Senators also bought-out Jonathan Cheechoo's contract on June 29 after he cleared waivers, making Cheechoo a free agent.

At the Entry Draft, the Senators traded their first-round pick to the St. Louis Blues for defenceman David Rundblad, who had been the Blues' first-round pick (17th overall) in the 2009 Draft. Having now previously traded their first, second- and fifth-round picks, the Senators picked Jakub Culek in the third round (76th overall), Marcus Sorensen in the fourth round (106th overall), Mark Stone in the sixth round (178th overall) and Bryce Aneloski in the seventh round (196th overall).

Throughout July, the Senators made various signings. On July 13, they signed Swiss forward and 2004 Senator draft pick Roman Wick to a one-year, entry-level contract, and re-signed Derek Smith to a one-year contract. On July 22, they re-signed forward Cody Bass to a one-year, two-way contract and forward Mike Hoffman to a one-year, entry-level contract.

Having fired Goaltending Coach Eli Wilson in January, the Senators signed former goaltender Rick Wamsley as goaltending coach on July 27. His most recent job was interim head coach of the St. Louis Blues' American Hockey League (AHL) affiliate, the Peoria Rivermen. He had at one time been Pascal Leclaire's goaltending coach with the Columbus Blue Jackets.

On August 5, the Senators re-signed Binghamton defenceman Geoff Kinrade to a one-year, two-way contract as well as signing forward and local prospect Corey Cowick to an entry-level contract. Cowick was an assistant captain with Ottawa's Ontario Hockey League (OHL) team, the Ottawa 67's, and was the Senators' sixth-round pick at the 2009 Draft.

Free agents
The Senators entered the off-season with four restricted free agents (RFAs): Chris Campoli, Nick Foligno, Peter Regin and Jesse Winchester. The team also had six unrestricted free agents (UFAs): Matt Cullen and Andy Sutton acquired via late 2009–10 season trades; Shean Donovan and Anton Volchenkov, as well as Binghamton players Martin St. Pierre and Josh Hennessy.

Of the four RFAs, all re-signed with the Senators. Winchester and Foligno each signed two-year deals on July 1 and July 21, respectively. Campoli and Regin both filed for arbitration, however they each re-signed before it reached that point. Regin signed a two-year deal on July 29, while Campoli signed a one-year deal on July 30.

Of the six UFAs, none re-signed with the Senators. On July 1, the first day of free agency, Volchenkov signed with the New Jersey Devils while Cullen signed a three-year deal with the Minnesota Wild. On August 2, Sutton signed with the Anaheim Ducks in a two-year deal. Donovan did not sign with any NHL team. St. Pierre and Hennessy both signed with teams overseas.

In terms of acquisitions, the Senators made a notable move in signing former Pittsburgh Penguins defenceman Sergei Gonchar to a three-year deal in the first hours after the July 1 free agency deadline. Other free agency acquisitions include forward Corey Locke, defenceman and enforcer Francis Lessard, defenceman David Hale and defenceman Andre Benoit.

Spezza trade speculation
In early June, an Ottawa Sun article reported that star centre Jason Spezza was "unhappy" and that there were "indications [he] may have asked for a trade." Though purely speculation, the article prompted various other Ottawa sports media sources to issue their own perspectives. Theories ranged from conjuring up various trade rumours, noting the similarity to the previous year's Dany Heatley trade demand, or to suggesting that it was just "lazy rumor mongering." Meanwhile, the Sun received criticism for its journalistic integrity to the point where they had to defend accusations that they were "anti-Spezza" This did not stop speculation, however, which was emboldened by silence both from Spezza and general manager Bryan Murray.

Spezza finally broke the silence during his annual Celebrity Classic golf tournament on July 20:
Further, he expressed regret that the issue had become public at all. "Me and Bryan have talked since then and probably our conversation should have stayed between us", he said. "We probably wouldn't even be talking here today. But it happened and it's a reality." His statement largely settled the rumour, apart from some minor speculation (again by Ottawa Sun columnists) that Spezza had in fact demanded a trade similar to Heatley. However, sources confirmed with Spezza's team members that the situation was "not even close to the Dany situation."

Pre-season
On June 18, the Senators announced that they would play eight pre-season games, which includes three home games, four road games and one neutral site game. The Senators faced the Toronto Maple Leafs three times, and had home-and-home sets against the Montreal Canadiens and New York Rangers. The Senators also played in the 2010 Kraft Hockeyville game in Dundas, Ontario, against the Buffalo Sabres. The game was played on September 28, 2010, at the J.L. Grightmire Market Street Arena.

Regular season
The Senators' regular season schedule was announced on June 22, 2010. The Senators opened the season at home against the Buffalo Sabres on October 8, 2010. The Senators end the season on the road against the Boston Bruins on April 9, 2011.

The Senators' goal for the season was to return to the playoffs for the 13th time in 14 seasons. Media predictions were mostly negative. The Hockey News predicted in their 2010–11 Yearbook that the Senators will finish tenth in the Eastern Conference, thereby missing the playoffs. The Hockey News writer Adam Proteau predicted the Senators will finish ninth in the Conference. The Las Vegas Hilton SportsBook set the odds at 40–1 that the Senators will win the Stanley Cup.

Within a few days of each other, two of the Senators celebrated milestones in wins. On October 22, Daniel Alfredsson scored a hat trick to reach 1,000 points in his career in a win against the Buffalo Sabres. On October 26, Sergei Gonchar played in his 1,000th game in his career. The game saw the Senators set a new team record for fastest two goals. Erik Karlsson and Alexei Kovalev scored only nine seconds apart, breaking the record of ten seconds set in 1995. The Senators defeated the Phoenix Coyotes 5–2.

On November 13, 2010, the 14-year-old daughter of Assistant Coach Luke Richardson died. The team, on a four-game road trip, returned to Ottawa for a "celebration of life" memorial service held at Scotiabank Place on November 17. Five-thousand and six-hundred mourners attended the service, including former NHL players Paul Coffey, Wendel Clark, Doug Gilmour and Tie Domi. The team flew out after the ceremony for a game against the Carolina Hurricanes that night. Richardson took a personal leave from the club. He returned to his duties with the Senators in January.

Another player reached the 1,000-point plateau on November 22 when Alexei Kovalev scored at the 10:00-minute mark of the first period. He became the third Russian player to reach the mark. Kovalev later assisted on the game-winning goal as the Senators prevailed over the Los Angeles Kings at home, 3–2.

The Senators set a new modern franchise record starting in the first period of a game of November 29 against the Edmonton Oilers through the game of December 5 against the New York Rangers. The team went through a scoring drought that lasted 202 minutes and 57 seconds without a goal. The Senators were shut out by the San Jose Sharks and Buffalo Sabres before Chris Kelly broke the streak in the second period of a game against the Rangers.

The Senators' poor performances led to constant rumours of a shakeup right through until December. The rumours were heightened in January after the team went on a lengthy losing streak. Owner Eugene Melnyk, who had remained silent during much of the streak, finally broke his silence in an exclusive interview with the Ottawa Sun. He made it clear that, despite rumours in the media to the contrary, general manager Bryan Murray and Head Coach Cory Clouston would be allowed to finish out their contracts and would not be replaced mid-season. Melnyk also assured the team's fanbase that a "plan [was] now in motion" to return the Senators to the status of Stanley Cup contenders, and that "difficult decisions" would be made in the coming months.

Those "difficult decisions" began on February 10, 2011, when the club traded long-time centre and fan favourite Mike Fisher to the Nashville Predators for a first-round and a conditional draft pick. The trade was met with mixed reaction from the Senators' fanbase. Some viewed it as an important step in the team's rebuilding process, while others were outraged at the loss of a player who was adored within the community. That outrage was most palpable when a local Ottawa radio station suggested that Fisher's new wife Carrie Underwood was largely responsible for his move to Nashville, and subsequently banned the play of her music. Underwood is a country music singer who is based in Nashville, where Fisher had recently begun living during the off-season.

Following the Fisher trade, the Senators traded another lifetime Senator, forward Chris Kelly, to the Boston Bruins in another move which was met with mixed reaction. The team shed salary by trading Jarkko Ruutu and the under-achieving Alexei Kovalev, both of whom were to become unrestricted free agent at season's end, to playoff contenders Anaheim Ducks and Pittsburgh Penguins, respectively.

Struggling goaltender Brian Elliott, a pending restricted free agent, was sent to the Colorado Avalanche in exchange for goalie Craig Anderson, who had also been struggling through an inconsistent season.
Anderson, scheduled to become an unrestricted free agent at the end of the season, was auditioned for a possible contract extension by the organization. Ottawa later acquired goaltender Curtis McElhinney on waivers on February 28. With Pascal Leclaire's injury status unknown and future with the team in doubt, the Senators finished their schedule with a vastly different goal-tending tandem than they had begun the season with.

Following speculation that longtime Senators defenceman and looming unrestricted free agent Chris Phillips would be dealt as part of the rebuilding process, the club instead signed him to a three-year extension on February 27, the day before the trade deadline. With a group of inexperienced young defencemen expected to stock the Senators' blueline in 2011–12, Phillips' experience was deemed an important asset. Defenceman Chris Campoli was traded on deadline day to the Chicago Blackhawks for forward Ryan Potulny and a conditional second-round draft pick, as Ottawa's rebuilding process continued.

For the rest of the season, the Senators rotated call-ups from Binghamton. On March 21, after 11 games with Ottawa, Craig Anderson was signed to a four-year extension by GM Murray. After media speculation on the future of Murray within the organization, Murray re-signed as general manager on April 8 to a three-year extension. After the final game of the season on April 9, Murray dismissed Cory Clouston and his assistant coaches.

Standings

Schedule and results

Pre-season

|- style="text-align:center; background:#cfc;"
| 1 || September 21 || Ottawa Senators || 5–0 || Toronto Maple Leafs || ||Lehner ||1–0–0
|- style="text-align:center; background:#fcc;"
| 2 || September 22 || Ottawa Senators || 1–4 || Toronto Maple Leafs || ||Elliott ||1–1–0
|- style="text-align:center; background:#fcc;"
| 3 || September 24 || Ottawa Senators || 2–4 || Montreal Canadiens || || Leclaire || 1–2–0
|- style="text-align:center; background:#cfc;"
| 4 || September 25 || Montreal Canadiens || 2–6 || Ottawa Senators || || Elliott || 2–2–0
|- style="text-align:center; background:#fcc;"
| 5 || September 28(in Dundas, Ontario) || Buffalo Sabres || 2–1 || Ottawa Senators || || Lehner || 2–3–0
|- style="text-align:center; background:#fcc;"
| 6 || September 29 || Toronto Maple Leafs || 4–3 || Ottawa Senators || || Leclaire ||2–4–0
|- style="text-align:center"
| 7 || October 1 || Ottawa Senators || 4–5 || New York Rangers || SO || Elliott || 2–4–1
|- style="text-align:center; background:#cfc;"
| 8 || October 2 || New York Rangers || 5-8 || Ottawa Senators || || Leclaire || 3–4–1
|-

Regular season

|- style="text-align:center; background:#fcc;"
| 1 || 8 || Buffalo Sabres || 1 – 2 || Scotiabank Place (19,350) || 0–1–0 || Leclaire || 0 ||
|- style="text-align:center; background:#fcc;"
| 2 || 9 || @ Toronto Maple Leafs || 1 – 5 || Air Canada Centre (19,157) || 0–2–0 || Leclaire || 0 ||
|- style="text-align:center;"
| 3 || 11 ||@ Washington Capitals || 2 – 3 (OT) || Verizon Center (18,398) || 0–2–1 || Leclaire || 1 ||
|- style="text-align:center; background:#cfc;"
| 4 || 14 || Carolina Hurricanes || 3 – 2 || Scotiabank Place (16,270) || 1–2–1 || Elliott || 3 ||
|- style="text-align:center; background:#fcc;"
| 5 || 16 || @ Montreal Canadiens || 3 – 4 || Bell Centre (21,273) || 1–3–1 || Elliott || 3 ||
|- style="text-align:center; background:#fcc;"
| 6 || 18 || @ Pittsburgh Penguins || 2 – 5 || Consol Energy Center (18,101) || 1–4–1 || Elliott || 3 ||
|- style="text-align:center; background:#cfc;"
| 7 || 22 || @ Buffalo Sabres || 4 – 2 || HSBC Arena (18,009) || 2–4–1 || Elliott || 5 ||
|- style="text-align:center; background:#fcc;"
| 8 || 23 || Montreal Canadiens || 0 – 3 || Scotiabank Place (20,301) || 2–5–1 || Elliott || 5 ||
|- style="text-align:center; background:#cfc;"
| 9 || 26 || Phoenix Coyotes || 5 – 2 || Scotiabank Place (16,686) || 3–5–1 || Elliott || 7 ||
|- style="text-align:center; background:#cfc;"
| 10 || 28 || Florida Panthers || 5 – 3 || Scotiabank Place (16,294) || 4–5–1 || Elliott || 9 ||
|- style="text-align:center; background:#fcc;"
| 11 || 30 || Boston Bruins || 0 – 3 || Scotiabank Place (18,959) || 4–6–1 || Elliott || 9 ||
|-

|- style="text-align:center; background:#cfc;"
| 12 || 2 || @ Toronto Maple Leafs || 3 – 2 || Air Canada Centre (19,409) || 5–6–1 || Elliott || 11 ||
|- style="text-align:center; background:#cfc;"
| 13 || 4 || New York Islanders || 4 – 1 || Scotiabank Place (17,752) || 6–6–1 || Elliott || 13 ||
|- style="text-align:center; background:#cfc;"
| 14 || 6 || @ Montreal Canadiens || 3 – 2 || Bell Centre (21,273) || 7–6–1 || Elliott || 15 ||
|- style="text-align:center; background:#cfc;"
| 15 || 9 || Atlanta Thrashers || 5 – 2 || Scotiabank Place (16,583) || 8–6–1 || Elliott || 17 ||
|- style="text-align:center; background:#fcc;"
| 16 || 11 || Vancouver Canucks || 2 – 6 || Scotiabank Place (19,191) || 8–7–1 || Leclaire || 17 ||
|- style="text-align:center; text-align:center; background:#cfc;"
| 17 || 13 || @ Boston Bruins || 2 – 0 || TD Garden (17,565) || 9–7–1 || Elliott || 19 ||
|- style="text-align:center; background:#fcc;"
| 18 || 15 || @ Philadelphia Flyers || 1 – 5 || Wells Fargo Center (19,256) || 9–8–1 || Elliott || 19 ||
|- style="text-align:center; background:#fcc;"
| 19 || 17 || @ Carolina Hurricanes || 1 – 7 || RBC Center (12,938) || 9–9–1 || Elliott || 19 ||
|- style="text-align:center; background:#fcc;"
| 20 || 19 || @ St. Louis Blues || 2 – 5 || Scottrade Center (19,150) || 9-10-1 || Elliott || 19 ||
|- style="text-align:center; background:#cfc;"
| 21 || 22 || Los Angeles Kings|| 3 – 2 || Scotiabank Place (18,315) || 10-10-1 || Leclaire || 21 ||
|- style="text-align:center; background:#fcc;"
| 22 || 24 || Dallas Stars ||1 – 2|| Scotiabank Place (16,281) || 10–11–1 || Leclaire || 21 ||
|- style="text-align:center; background:#fcc;"
| 23 || 26 || @ Pittsburgh Penguins ||1 – 2|| Consol Energy Center (18,299) || 10–12–1 || Leclaire || 21 ||
|- style="text-align:center; background:#cfc;"
| 24 || 27 || Toronto Maple Leafs || 3 – 0 || Scotiabank Place (20,275) || 11–12–1 || Elliott || 23 ||
|- style="text-align:center; text-align:center; background:#fcc;"
| 25 || 29 || Edmonton Oilers || 1 – 4 || Scotiabank Place (17,002) || 11–13–1 || Elliott || 23 ||
|-

|- style="text-align:center; background:#fcc;"
| 26 || 2 || San Jose Sharks || 0 – 4 || Scotiabank Place (18,017) || 11–14–1 || Leclaire || 23 ||
|- style="text-align:center; background:#fff;"
| 27 || 4 || Buffalo Sabres || 0 – 1 (SO) || Scotiabank Place (16,364) || 11–14–2 || Elliott || 24 ||
|- style="text-align:center; background:#cfc;"
| 28 || 5 || @ New York Rangers || 3 – 1 || Madison Square Garden (18,200) || 12–14–2 || Leclaire || 26 ||
|- style="text-align:center; background:#fcc;"
| 29 || 7 || @ Montreal Canadiens || 1 – 4 || Bell Centre (21,273) || 12–15–2 || Leclaire || 26 ||
|- style="text-align:center; background:#fcc;"
| 30 || 9 || New York Rangers || 3 – 5 || Scotiabank Place (16,324) || 12–16–2 || Elliott || 26 ||
|- style="text-align:center; background:#cfc;"
| 31 || 10 || New Jersey Devils || 3 – 2 || Scotiabank Place (16,471) || 13–16–2 || Leclaire || 28 ||
|- style="text-align:center; background:#fff"
| 32 || 13 || Atlanta Thrashers || 3 – 4 (OT) || Scotiabank Place (18,184) || 13–16–3 || Elliott || 29 ||
|- style="text-align:center; background:#cfc;"
| 33 || 16 || @ Minnesota Wild || 3 – 1 || Xcel Energy Center (17,366) || 14–16–3 || Leclaire || 31 ||
|- style="text-align=:center; background:#fff"
| 34 || 17 || @ Colorado Avalanche || 5 – 6 (OT) || Pepsi Center (15,113) || 14–16–4 || Elliott || 32 ||
|- style="text-align:center; background:#fcc;"
| 35 || 19 || Washington Capitals || 2 – 3 || Scotiabank Place (19,516) || 14–17–4 || Elliott || 32 ||
|- style="text-align:center; background:#cfc;"
| 36 || 23 || @ Nashville Predators || 2 – 1 || Bridgestone Arena ( 17,113) || 15–17–4 || Elliott || 34 ||
|- style="text-align:center; background:#cfc;"
| 37 || 26 || Pittsburgh Penguins || 3 – 1 || Scotiabank Place (20,146) || 16–17–4 || Elliott || 36 ||
|- style="text-align:center; background:#fcc;"
| 38 || 29 || Carolina Hurricanes || 0 – 4 || Scotiabank Place (20,221) || 16–18–4 || Elliott || 36 ||
|- style="text-align:center; background:#fff;"
| 39 || 31 || @ Columbus Blue Jackets || 3 – 4 (OT) || Nationwide Arena (17,652) || 16–18–5 || Elliott || 37 ||
|-

|- style="text-align:center; background:#fcc;"
| 40 || 1 || Toronto Maple Leafs || 1 – 5 || Scotiabank Place (20,027) || 16–19–5 || Elliott || 37 ||
|- style="text-align:center;"
| 41 || 7 || @ Chicago Blackhawks || 2 – 3 (SO) || United Center (21,657) || 16–19–6 || Elliott || 38 ||
|- style="text-align:center; background:#fcc;"
| 42 || 8 || Tampa Bay Lightning || 1 – 2 || Scotiabank Place (19,698) || 16–20–6 || Elliott || 38 ||
|- style="text-align:center; background:#fcc;"
| 43 || 11 || Boston Bruins || 0 – 6 || TD Garden (17,565) || 16–21–6 || Elliott || 38 ||
|- style="text-align:center; background:#cfc;"
| 44 || 13 || @ New York Islanders || 6 – 4 || Nassau Veterans Memorial Coliseum (8,670) || 17–21–6 || Lehner || 40 ||
|- style="text-align:center; background:#fcc;"
| 45 || 14 || Calgary Flames || 2 – 3 || Scotiabank Place (19,984) || 17–22–6 || Elliott || 40 ||
|- style="text-align:center; background:#fcc;"
| 46 || 16 || @ Washington Capitals || 1 – 3 || Verizon Center (18,398) || 17–23–6 || Elliott || 40 ||
|- style="text-align:center; background:#fff;"
| 47 || 18 ||Anaheim Ducks || 1 – 2 (SO) || Scotiabank Place (19,515) || 17–23–7 || Elliott || 41 ||
|- style="text-align:center; background:#fcc;"
| 48 || 20 || @ Philadelphia Flyers || 2 – 6 || Wells Fargo Center (19,721) || 17–24–7 || Elliott || 41 ||
|- style="text-align:center; background:#fcc;"
| 49 || 21 || Montreal Canadiens || 1 – 7 || Scotiabank Place (20,337) || 17–25–7 || Brodeur || 41 ||
|- style="text-align:center;"
| 50 || 25 || Buffalo Sabres || 2 – 3 (OT) || Scotiabank Place (18,990) || 17–25–8 || Elliott || 42 ||
|-

|- style="text-align:center; background:#fcc;"
| 51 || 1 || @ New Jersey Devils || 1 – 2 || Prudential Center (7,218) || 17–26–8 || Lehner || 42 ||
|- style="text-align:center; background:#fcc;"
| 52 || 2 || Detroit Red Wings || 5 – 7 || Scotiabank Place (18,011) || 17–27–8 || Elliott || 42 ||
|- style="text-align:center; background:#fcc;"
| 53 || 5 || @ New York Islanders || 3 – 5 || Nassau Veterans Memorial Coliseum (10,415) || 17–28–8 || Lehner || 42 ||
|- style="text-align:center; background:#fcc;"
| 54 || 7 || @ Vancouver Canucks || 2 – 4 || Rogers Arena (18,860) || 17–29–8 || Elliott || 42 ||
|- style="text-align:center; background:#fcc;"
| 55 || 9 || @ Calgary Flames || 2 – 5 || Pengrowth Saddledome (19,289) || 17–30–8 || Lehner || 42 ||
|- style="text-align:center; background:#cfc;"
| 56 || 12 || @ Edmonton Oilers || 5 – 3 || Rexall Place (16,839) || 18-30-8 || Elliott || 44 ||
|- style="text-align:center; background:#fff;"
| 57 || 15 || New York Islanders || 3 – 4 (SO)|| Scotiabank Place (17,565) || 18-30-9 || Elliott || 45 ||
|- style="text-align:center; background:#fcc;"
| 58 || 18 || Boston Bruins || 2 – 4 || Scotiabank Place (18,521) || 18-31-9 || Lehner || 45 ||
|- style="text-align:center; background:#cfc;"
| 59 || 19 || @ Toronto Maple Leafs || 1 – 0 (SO) || Air Canada Centre (19,460) || 19-31-9 || Anderson || 47 ||
|- style="text-align:center; background:#cfc;"
| 60 || 23 || Florida Panthers || 5 – 1 || Scotiabank Place (16,520) || 20–31–9 || Anderson || 49 ||
|- style="text-align:center; background:#fcc;"
| 61 || 25 || @ Buffalo Sabres || 2 – 4 || HSBC Arena (18,690) || 20–32–9 || Anderson || 49 ||
|- style="text-align:center; background:#cfc;"
| 62 || 26 || Philadelphia Flyers || 4 – 1 || Scotiabank Place (19,934) || 21–32–9 || Anderson || 51 ||
|-

|- style="text-align:center; background:#fcc;"
| 63 || 1 || Boston Bruins || 0 – 1 || Scotiabank Place (16,826) || 21–33–9 || Anderson || 51 ||
|- style="text-align:center; background:#cfc;"
| 64 || 3 || @ Atlanta Thrashers || 3 – 1 || Philips Arena (10,461) || 22–33–9 || Anderson || 53 ||
|- style="text-align:center; background:#fcc;"
| 65 || 4 || New York Rangers || 1 – 4 || Scotiabank Place (17,497) || 22–34–9 || Anderson || 53 ||
|- style="text-align:center; background:#cfc;"
| 66 || 8 || @ New Jersey Devils || 2 – 1 || Prudential Center (15,978) || 23–34–9 || Anderson || 55 ||
|- style="text-align:center; background:#cfc;"
| 67 || 10 || @ Florida Panthers || 2 – 1 || BankAtlantic Center (12,310) || 24–34–9 || Anderson || 57 ||
|- style="text-align:center; background:#cfc;"
| 68 || 11 || @ Tampa Bay Lightning || 2 – 1 || St. Pete Times Forum (18,777) || 25–34–9 || McElhinney || 59 ||
|- style="text-align:center; background:#fcc;"
| 69 || 13 || @ Buffalo Sabres || 3 – 6 || HSBC Arena (18,690) || 25–35–9 || Anderson || 59 ||
|- style="text-align:center; background:#fcc;"
| 70 || 15 || Pittsburgh Penguins ||1 – 5|| Scotiabank Place (19,249) || 25–36–9 || Anderson || 59 ||
|- style="text-align:center; background:#cfc;"
| 71 || 17 || New Jersey Devils || 3 – 1 || Scotiabank Place (17,758) || 26–36–9 || McElhinney || 61 ||
|- style="text-align:center; background:#cfc;"
| 72 || 19 || Tampa Bay Lightning || 3 – 2 (OT) || Scotiabank Place (18,883) || 27–36–9 || McElhinney || 63 ||
|- style="text-align:center; background:#fcc;"
| 73 || 22 || @ Carolina Hurricanes || 3 – 4 || RBC Centre (16,189) || 27–37–9 || McElhinney || 63 ||
|- style="text-align:center; background:#cfc;"
| 74 || 24 || @ New York Rangers || 2 – 1 (SO) || Madison Square Garden (18,200) || 28–37–9 || Anderson || 65 ||
|- style="text-align:center; background:#cfc;"
| 75 || 25 || Washington Capitals || 2 – 0 || Scotiabank Place (18,329) || 29–37–9 || Anderson || 67 ||
|- style="text-align:center;"
| 76 || 27 || @ Atlanta Thrashers || 4 – 5 (SO) || Philips Arena (16,392) || 29–37–10 || Anderson || 68 ||
|- style="text-align:center; background:#fcc;"
| 77 || 29 || @ Tampa Bay Lightning || 2 – 5 || St. Pete Times Forum (16,626) || 29–38–10 || McElhinney || 68 ||
|- style="text-align:center; background:#cfc;"
| 78 || 31 || @ Florida Panthers || 4 – 1 || BankAtlantic Center (15,672) || 30–38–10 || Anderson || 70 ||
|-

|- style="text-align:center; background:#fcc;"
| 79 || 2 || Toronto Maple Leafs || 2 – 4 || Scotiabank Place (19,243) || 30–39–10 || Anderson || 70 ||
|- style="text-align:center; background:#cfc;"
| 80 || 5 || Philadelphia Flyers || 5 – 2 || Scotiabank Place (18,397) || 31–39–10 || Anderson || 72 ||
|- style="text-align:center; background:#cfc;"
| 81 || 7 || Montreal Canadiens || 3 – 2 (OT) || Scotiabank Place (19,809)|| 32–39–10 || Anderson || 74 ||
|- style="text-align:center; background:#fcc;"
| 82 || 9 || @ Boston Bruins || 1 – 3 || Boston Garden (17,565) || 32–40–10 || McElhinney || 74 ||
|-

|-
| Source: Ottawa Senators
|-
| Legend:

Player statistics

Skaters

Goaltenders

†Denotes player spent time with another team before joining Senators. Stats reflect time with Senators only.
‡Traded mid-season.

Awards/Milestones
 Ryan Shannon – Ottawa Senators' nominee for Bill Masterton Trophy

Milestones

Transactions

Trades

Free agents acquired

Free agents lost

Claimed via waivers

Lost via waivers

Player signings

Draft picks 
The 2010 NHL Entry Draft was held at the Staples Center in Los Angeles June 25–26, 2010.

Farm teams 
 Binghamton Senators (American Hockey League (AHL))
 Elmira Jackals (ECHL)

The Senators signed Kurt Kleinendorst to a two-year deal to be head coach of Binghamton. He was previously the head coach of the USA Hockey National Team Development Program, which won the Under-18 World Championship in 2010.

Binghamton qualified for the Calder Cup playoffs for the first time since 2005. After nearly being eliminated in the first round by the Manchester Monarchs, the Senators defeated the Portland Pirates in the second round and swept the Charlotte Checkers in the third round series to advance to the team's first-ever Calder Cup Final. The Senators defeated the Houston Aeros in six games to win the Calder Cup championship. Goaltender Robin Lehner was named the playoffs' Most Valuable Player and received the Jack A. Butterfield Trophy.

See also 
 2010–11 NHL season

References 

O
2010-11
Ottawa